Jesenice is a municipality and village in Příbram District in the Central Bohemian Region of the Czech Republic. It has about 500 inhabitants.

Administrative parts
Villages and hamlets of Boudy, Dobrošovice, Dolce, Doublovičky, Hulín, Martinice, Mezné and Vršovice are administrative parts of Jesenice.

References

Villages in Příbram District